Lion in the Valley is the 1986 fourth novel in a series of historical mystery novels, written by Elizabeth Peters and featuring fictional sleuth and archaeologist Amelia Peabody.

Plot summary
The Emersons return to Egypt in 1895–96 to excavate at Dahshoor - finally, some real pyramids for Amelia!

In looking for a keeper for Ramses, they find a demoralized Englishman named Donald Fraser. Donald has troubled family relationships and a hashish habit, both of which Amelia means to reform. Enid Debenham, a young lady whose behavior scandalizes Cairo society, also takes a hand when Amelia takes her under her wing.

Meanwhile, the Master Criminal reappears personally, taking an interest not only in illegally obtained antiquities but in the person of Amelia herself.

The story is key in the series because it is the first time the reader learns the pseudonym of the Master Criminal: Sethos.  It is the name of a number of Pharaohs, and is tied to Set or Seth, the Egyptian god of the desert.  Sethos interacts in a number of ways, including offering gifts and returning the communion set stolen from Mazghuna the previous year.  Sethos also appears in a number of guises, only one of which Amelia sees through.  She does, however, assume a number of others are either Sethos or in his gang, almost always incorrectly.

Donald and Enid return in a later novel, Seeing a Large Cat.

Explanation of the novel's title
The title is taken from the Battle of Kadesh Inscriptions of King Ramses II:
"Lord of fear, great of fame,In the hearts of all the lands.Great of awe, rich in glory,As is Set upon his mountain. ...Like a wild lion in a valley of goats."

See also

List of characters in the Amelia Peabody series

1986 novels
Amelia Peabody
Historical mystery novels
Novels set in Egypt
Fiction set in 1895
Fiction set in 1896
Novels set in the 1890s
Atheneum Books books